Higher Power is the seventh album by Big Audio Dynamite (renamed Big Audio), released in 1994. First released in the US on 8 November, it was then released in the UK the following week on 14 November 1994. "Looking for a Song" was released as a single; it peaked at No. 24 on Billboard'''s Modern Rock Tracks chart. The band supported the album with a North American tour. 

Production
Many of its songs are about English middle class life. Mick Jones was inspired by Bob Marley to include uplifting messages in Higher Power's songs.

Critical receptionTrouser Press wrote that "Higher Power finds Jones and company operating at a decidedly lower level ... The hip dance-music sounds are there, but the tunes most certainly aren't." Entertainment Weekly thought that the album "continues Jones' bid for currency by experimenting with the sounds of London's dance clubs ... The result is neither good rave nor good rock." 

The Knoxville News Sentinel called it "an alternative album at the core that absorbs a fun array of funk, pop and hip-hop influences for a distinctive and accessible blend." The Calgary Herald'' determined that "it just bops along with riffs that are pleasant enough but lack any edge, any passion."

Track listing

Personnel
 Mick Jones - guitar, vocals, producer
 Nick Hawkins - vocals, guitar, engineer
 André Shapps - keyboards, producer, engineer
 Gary Stonadge - bass, vocals
 Chris Kavanagh - drums, vocals
 Mickey Custance - DJ, vocals
 Ranking Roger - vocals
 Aki Omori, Loro Lucan - backing vocals on "Some People"
 Heathcote Williams - biographical editor
 John R.T. Davies - editing
 Arthur Baker - co-producer of track 6
 Würzel - photography

References

Big Audio Dynamite albums
1994 albums
Albums produced by Arthur Baker (musician)
Columbia Records albums